Jack Holden (born 31 March 1990) is an English actor, writer and producer from Tonbridge in Kent. He is best known for his roles in the television series Marriage with Sean Bean and Nicola Walker and in Ten Percent. Holden began his acting career starring in West End play War Horse.

Education
Holden graduated from the Bristol Old Vic theater school in 2011.

Career
After graduating from the Bristol Old Vic, Holden starred in the lead role in the West End play War Horse,

In 2014, Holden played the role of Joe Bonham in the UK première of the play Johnny Got His Gun, based on the novel by Dalton Trumbo. His performance received a positive review from The Independent.

His performance as Bobby in an adaptation of Awkward Conversations With Animals I've Fucked by Rob Hayes during the 2014-15 Edinburgh Fringe received critical acclaim. Holden has also performed frequently with the Royal Shakespeare Company in such productions as The Shoemaker's Holiday by Thomas Dekker, and in the world première of Tim Morton Smith's Oppenheimer directed by Angus Jackson and starring John Heffernan as Robert Oppenheimer. 

Holden recorded several episodes of the BBC Radio drama Home Front, and played the part of Meus in the BBC Radio 4's broadcast premiere of Orson Welles' unproduced screenplay of Joseph Conrad's novel Heart of Darkness, starring James McAvoy.

From February 2016, Holden appeared as Lysander in a national tour of Midsummer Night's Dream which visited 12 venues including Belfast, Glasgow, Newcastle, Blackpool, Truro, the RSC's homes at the Barbican Centre and the Royal Shakespeare Theatre in Stratford. The BBC planned to film the production which involved actors from 12 different amateur theatre companies. Holden also appeared in the 2017 film Journey's End. Holden was in the world première of Ink by James Graham at the Almeida Theatre from June to August 2017, and in 2019 he was in the Bath Theatre Royal production of My Cousin Rachel (the play by Joseph O'Connor based on the Daphne du Maurier novel) with Helen George and Simon Shepherd.

As a writer, Holden's debut one-man play Cruise premiered at the Duchess Theatre, London in Summer 2021, reopening the West End to critical acclaim; it was nominated for an Olivier Award for Best New Play. Cruise music producer John Patrick Elliott won the Best Composer Award at The Stage Debut Awards 2022, which was accepted by Holden on Elliott's behalf.

In 2022, Holden appeared as Kevin Barnes in Ten Percent, the English remake of the French original, Call My Agent!.

Personal life
Holden identifies as queer.

Filmography

Actor

Producer

References

Living people
People from Tonbridge
English male stage actors
English male television actors
Male actors from Kent
1990 births